London College of Creative Media (LCCM) is a private college of higher education in South London offering undergraduate degrees in music, writing, and music management; a postgraduate degree in creative entrepreneurship; and shorter courses in music performance and production. It was founded in 2002 as the London Centre of Contemporary Music and changed to its present name in 2016. LCCM was also the home of the National Youth Jazz Orchestra from 2012 to 2017.

History

LCCM was founded in 2002 by Geoff Hemsley and Darius Khwaja. Both were professional musicians; Khwaja had also worked for various arts organizations on a freelance basis. Initially called London Centre of Contemporary Music, the college specialised both in teaching the technical aspects of contemporary popular music and in preparation for a career in the industry. In 2003 LCCM moved to premises at 50–52 Union Street in the Bankside district of London.

In its early years LCCM offered the Higher National Diploma (HND) and the National Vocational Qualification (NVQ) level 4 in Music, both of which were validated by Pearson Edexcel. In 2007, the college added a BMus degree course awarded and validated by Middlesex University. Corporate restructuring in 2016 led to the addition of new degrees in Creative and Professional Writing, Creative Entrepreneurship, and Digital Product Development. The Open University replaced Middlesex as the awarding and validating body for all its degrees. That same year LCCM changed its registered company name to the London College of Creative Media to reflect its extended range of undergraduate degrees outside of its core focus on music education. In 2017, the college moved into a new purpose-built campus on Union Street adjacent to its old building.

Financial difficulties had begun to surface in late 2016. The UK Department for Education decided that LCCM's students would still be eligible to receive student loans, but asked the Open University to put in place a contingency plan to ensure that its students could continue their courses in the event of the college becoming insolvent. During 2017 LCCM's board of governors held discussions with a number of possible financial partners and in November of that year began formal negotiations with Global University Systems (GUS) with a view to the company acquiring the college. The negotiations were ongoing on 8 January 2018 when LCCM went into administration. Four days later, the administrators sold LCCM to GUS. LCCM subsequently announced that as part of Global University Systems it would remain fully operational with no material changes to either tutors or student activity. Students were able to complete their courses without interruption through LCCM's existing collaboration with the Open University.

In the National Student Survey 2020, LCCM ranked as the top contemporary music institution in the UK with an overall student satisfaction score of 86.5%.”

Campus
LCCM's new campus on 241 Union Street was built in 2017. Designed by Trevor Moriss and known as "The Music Box", the cube-shaped building houses the college on its first six floors. Its exterior is decorated with glazed bricks laid in a pattern replicating the piano arrangement of Cream's song "White Room". The building can accommodate 550 students and includes recording studios with double-height windows which allow passers-by to see those working inside and an underground performance space which seats 200. The upper floors of the building are devoted to privately owned apartments.

Programmes
As of 2018, the college offers BA (Honours) degrees in Creative and Professional Writing, Music Industry Management, and Creative Music Technology; a BMus (Hons) degree in Music Performance and Production; and an MA in Creative Entrepreneurship. It also offers Certificates of Higher Education in Creative Music Practice and Music Performance. All academic programmes are validated and awarded by the Open University apart from the BA in Creative Music Technology which is validated and awarded by Falmouth University. The college offers additional short courses in music development and a summer school for young musicians.

Notable faculty and alumni
Alumni and past and present faculty of LCCM include:
Charlie Cawood, multi-instrumental musician and composer (tutor and graduate 2009) 
 Hafdís Huld, singer and actress (graduate 2006)
Trudy Kerr, jazz vocalist (tutor)
Dave O'Higgins, jazz saxophonist, composer, arranger (tutor)
Merlin Rhys-Jones, guitarist and former member of The Blockheads (tutor)
Tom Walker, singer and songwriter (graduate 2014)
Ned Wyndham, Alex "Billy" Hill, and Josh Martens, members of the Scoundrels (graduates 2007)

References

External links
 Official website

Music schools in London
Music in London